Alan Butts (born 11 April 1940) is a British wrestler. He competed in the men's freestyle middleweight at the 1960 Summer Olympics.

References

External links
 

1940 births
Living people
British male sport wrestlers
Olympic wrestlers of Great Britain
Wrestlers at the 1960 Summer Olympics
Sportspeople from Birmingham, West Midlands